Marta Portoblanco (born 29 January 1971) is a Nicaraguan long-distance runner. She competed in the women's 5000 metres at the 1996 Summer Olympics.

References

1971 births
Living people
Athletes (track and field) at the 1996 Summer Olympics
Nicaraguan female long-distance runners
Olympic athletes of Nicaragua
Place of birth missing (living people)